The Complete Master Works 2 is a video album by American comedy rock band Tenacious D. Released on November 4, 2008, it features footage from the band's performances at the Paramount Theatre in Seattle, Washington on February 16 and 17, 2007, during The Pick of Destiny Tour. The release also features numerous bonus videos and D Tour: A Tenacious Documentary. It is the successor to the band's previous collection The Complete Master Works.

A notable mistake on the DVD case states that the footage of the Seattle performances was recorded at the Moore Theatre. The band would go on to perform at the Moore Theatre over ten years later in December 2018, as part of their Post-Apocalypto Tour.

Track listing

Disc one
Live concert
"Kielbasa" 
"History" 
"Wonderboy" 
"Dio" 
"Lee" 
"Sax-A-Boom" 
"The Road" 
"Hell Movie Skit" 
"Kickapoo"
"Karate" 
"Dude (I Totally Miss You)" 
"Kyle Quit the Band" 
"Friendship" 
"The Metal" 
"Papagenu (He's My Sassafrass)" 
"Master Exploder" 
"Beelzeboss (The Final Showdown)" 
"Double Team"
"Fuck Her Gently" 
"Tribute" 
"Who Medley"

Disc two 
 D Tour: A Tenacious Documentary
Bonus features
"Master Exploder" live on Late Night with Conan O'Brien
2006 MTV Movie Awards performance
"The Metal" live on Saturday Night Live
Tenacious D: Time Fixers
"Classico" music video

Personnel 
Band
Jack Black – lead vocals, rhythm acoustic guitar
Kyle Gass – lead acoustic guitar, backing vocals
John Konesky – electric guitar
John Spiker – bass
Brooks Wackerman – drums
JR Reed - additional vocals

Production
 Wayne Isham – director
 Dana Marshall – producer
 Lukas Ettlin – director of photography
 Kevin McCullough – editor
 Brett Eliason – live audio recording
 Andrew Scheps – audio mixing

References 

Tenacious D video albums
2008 video albums
Live video albums
2008 live albums